The 2014 BGL Luxembourg Open was a women's tennis tournament played on indoor hard courts sponsored by BNP Paribas. It was the 19th edition of the Luxembourg Open, and part of the WTA International tournaments category of the 2014 WTA Tour. It was held in Kockelscheuer, Luxembourg on 13–19 October 2014. Unseeded Annika Beck won the singles title.

Points and prize money

Point distribution

Prize money

1 Qualifiers prize money is also the Round of 32 prize money
* per team

Singles entrants

Seeds 

 Rankings as of 6 October 2014

Other entrants 
The following players received wildcards into the singles main draw:
  Julia Görges
  Antonia Lottner
  Mandy Minella

The following player received entry as a special exempt:
  Anna-Lena Friedsam

The following players received entry from the qualifying draw:
  Denisa Allertová
  Lucie Hradecká
  Ons Jabeur
  Johanna Larsson

Withdrawals 
Before the tournament
  Victoria Azarenka (foot injury) → replaced by  Polona Hercog
  Eugenie Bouchard (left thigh injury) → replaced by  Marina Erakovic
  Kaia Kanepi → replaced by  Timea Bacsinszky
  Garbiñe Muguruza → replaced by  Alison Van Uytvanck
  Anna Karolína Schmiedlová → replaced by  Patricia Mayr-Achleitner
  Heather Watson → replaced by  Kiki Bertens

Retirements 
  Karin Knapp (left thigh injury)

Doubles entrants

Seeds 

 1 Rankings as of 6 October 2014

Finals

Singles 

  Annika Beck defeated  Barbora Záhlavová-Strýcová 6–2, 6–1

Doubles

  Timea Bacsinszky /  Kristina Barrois defeated  Lucie Hradecká /  Barbora Krejčíková 3–6, 6–4, [10–4]

External links 
 Official website
 WTA tournament draws

2014 WTA Tour
2014
2014 in Luxembourgian tennis